Sybris is an American indie rock band from Chicago, Illinois.

History
Sybris formed in 2003 in Chicago. The name is an intentional misspelling of Sybaris, an Ancient Greek city. They signed to Flameshovel Records for the release of their 2005 self-titled debut. A national tour followed the album's release. Their second full-length appeared on Absolutely Kosher in 2008.

In 2009 Sybris's song "Breathe Like You're Dancing" was used in the Movie "According to Greta" starring Hilary Duff.

Members
Angela Mullenhour - vocals
Eric Mahle - drums
Phil Naumann - guitar
Shaun Podgurski - bass, vocals

Discography
Sybris (Flameshovel Records, 2005)
Into the Trees (Absolutely Kosher, 2008)

References

External links
Official website 

Indie rock musical groups from Illinois
Musical groups from Chicago
Flameshovel Records artists